Pseudopachystylum is a genus of flies in the family Tachinidae.

Species
Pseudopachystylum debile (Townsend, 1919) 
Pseudopachystylum gonioides (Zetterstedt, 1838)

References

Tachinidae